The Vapniarka concentration camp was a concentration camp established in Vapniarka, Ukraine.

History 
Soon after Romania, under the leadership of Ion Antonescu, joined the war on the Axis side and took part in the invasion of the Soviet Union, its administration extended over the Dniester and areas up to then forming part of the Ukrainian SSR (see Romania during World War II). By that time, the 700 local Jewish inhabitants had fled or had been killed by the Nazi German or Romanian troops. In October 1941, the Romanians established a detention camp in Vapniarka. One thousand Jews were brought to the site that month, mostly from the city of Odessa. Some 200 died in a typhus epidemic; the others were taken out of the camp in two batches, guarded by soldiers of the Romanian Gendarmerie, and shot to death.

In 1942, 150 Jews from Bukovina were brought to Vapniarka. On September 16 of that year, 1,046 Romanian Jews were also brought to the camp. About half had been banished from their homes on suspicion of being communists, but 554 had been included without any specific charges being brought against them. This was the last transport to arrive at the camp; its status was changed to that of a concentration camp for political prisoners, under the direct control of the Romanian Minister of the Interior, Dumitru I. Popescu. In practice, Vapniarka was a concentration camp for Jewish prisoners, since no other political suspects were held there—the only other inmates were several Ukrainian convicts. Of the 1,179 Jews in the camp, 107 were women, who were housed in two huts surrounded by a triple-apron barbed-wire fence.

Among the Jewish prisoners were 130 members of the Romanian Communist Party, 200 Social Democrats, as well as Trotskyists and Zionists. Most of the prisoners, however, had been arrested on purely arbitrary grounds. The inmates established a camp committee to help them survive despite starvation, disease, hard labor, and physical and mental torture. Apart from the official committee, the camp also had an underground leadership, and, together, the two bodies persuaded the prisoners to observe discipline voluntarily.

The father of Costin Murgescu, Ion, had "strong pro-Nazi sympathies" and by September 1942 he was the camp commandant in Vapniarka. He introduced severe restrictions on the supply of water. By keeping the camp meticulously clean, the prisoners were able to overcome the typhus epidemic,  but they suffered from the poor quality of the food, which included Lathyrus sativus, a species of pea that was normally used to feed livestock, and barley bread that had a 20% straw content. A team of doctors among the inmates, led by Dr. Arthur Kessler of Cernăuţi, reached the conclusion that the disease presented all the symptoms of lathyrism, a spastic paralysis caused by the oxalyldiaminopropionic acid present in the pea fodder. Within a few weeks, the first symptoms of the disease appeared, affecting the bone marrow of prisoners and causing paralysis. By January 1943, hundreds of prisoners were suffering from lathyrism. The inmates declared a hunger strike and demanded medical assistance. As a result, the authorities allowed the Jewish Aid Committee in Bucharest to supply them with medicine, and the prisoners' relatives were allowed to send them parcels. It was only at the end of January that the prisoners were no longer fed with the animal fodder that had caused the disease, but 117 Jews were paralyzed for life.

In March 1943, it was found that 427 Jews had been imprisoned for no reason whatsoever. They were moved to various ghettos in Transnistria, but were sent back to Romania and released only in December 1943–January 1944. In October 1943, when the Soviet Red Army was approaching the region, it was decided to liquidate the camp. 80 Jews were sent to ghettos in Transnistria. 54 Communists were taken to a prison in Rîbnița, Transnistria, where they were killed in their cells by SS men on March 19, 1944. A third group, which included most of the prisoners (565 persons), was moved to Romania in March 1944 and imprisoned in the camp for political prisoners in Târgu Jiu, until after the fall of the Antonescu government in August.

Many of the former prisoners in Vapniarka were appointed to senior posts in Communist Romania, among them Simion Bughici (who became Foreign Minister).

Notes

Internment camps
The Holocaust in Transnistria
The Holocaust in Bessarabia and Bukovina
Holocaust locations in Romania